Mixed White and Black Caribbean is an ethnic group category that was first introduced by the United Kingdom's Office for National Statistics for the 2001 Census. Colloquially it refers to British citizens or residents whose parents are of a White ethnic background and Black Caribbean ethnic background. This classification is only used in England and Wales, as Scotland and Northern Ireland do not have sub categories for their mixed group options.

They have a total population of 513,042, representing 0.9% of England and Wales, an increase from 426,715 in 2011 and 237,420 in 2001.

Demographics 
The White and Black Caribbean Mixed population has increased with each decennial census, starting from 237,420 people with the category's introduction in 2001, rising to 426,715 in 2011 to now 513,042 in 2021 in England and Wales.

Religion

See also 

 Mixed (United Kingdom ethnicity category)
 Mixed White and Black African people in the United Kingdom

References 

Afro-Caribbean culture in England
Sub-ethnic groups